Northeast Historic Film (NHF) is a regional moving image archive located at 85 Main Street in Bucksport, Maine. It is a tax-exempt nonprofit organization dedicated to collecting, preserving and sharing film and video related to the people of Northern New England.

In 2013 the Association of Moving Image Archivists honored NHF with the Silver Light Award, honoring substantial contributions to the field.

The archive safeguards film and videotape through restoration, duplication, creating access tools such as catalog records, and climate-controlled storage in its Conservation Center.

The Collection 

NHF collects professional and amateur moving images related to Maine, New Hampshire, Vermont, and Massachusetts. The films and videos are preserved and made available to members of the public, scholars, and members of the film and video production community.

The collection includes home movies, silent dramas, industrial films, and independent projects. NHF also has a substantial collection of footage from local television stations dating back to the 1950s. The archives hold over 10 million feet of film and 8,000 videotapes from 1896 to the present. 

In addition to the vast moving image collections, the archives has a substantial collection of moving image technology including projectors, cameras, splicers, and viewers—and film ephemera including posters, scrapbooks, sheet music, letters, and theater logs.

Education 

NHF offers programs for the public including screenings, online exhibits and events at art museums, film festivals and agricultural fairs. For moving image professionals, NHF offers internships, onsite and traveling workshops and an annual summer symposium.  The William O'Farrell Fellowship supports study in Northeast Historic Film's collections; applications for the $1500 stipend are invited. Proposed research must be for work intended for publication, production, or presentation with significant research in the NHF collections .

Screenings at the Portland Museum of Art, Portland, Maine

2001 Exceptional Amateur Film, including Mag the Hag (1925), Miss Olympia (1929), Paris, Maine (1929), Ice Harvesting (1943), live music by Martin Marks 
      
2002 Maine TV History Highlights, introduced by Pat Callaghan, WCSH-TV

2002  Our Now is Your Then, silent films including Cherryfield, 1938, live music by Elliott Schwartz

2003 You Work, We'll Watch, film documents on earning a living, including Ed Marks from the Portland Veteran Firemen's Association introducing the 1963 docudrama 24 Hours

2004 Summer Camps, live music by Paul Sullivan, presented with the Maine Youth Camping Association

2005 Invisible, presented by James Eric Francis, the Penobscot Nation's Tribal Historian.

2006 NHF's 20th Anniversary celebration with Karen Shopsowitz presenting My Father's Camera.

Cinema 

With the help of members and friends, NHF bought the Alamo Theatre in downtown Bucksport in 1992. The renovation of the 1916 cinema brought the community theater back to Bucksport, Maine. Soon after NHF purchased the building, the archive opened the doors for a public 16mm film screening series. Now, the cinema shows current films every weekend and hosts a number of special events, including screenings of old films projected in their original format. Each screening begins with an Archival Moment, a brief selection from the archives.

History 

Karan Sheldon and David Weiss founded Northeast Historic Film in 1986. Two years later, NHF collaborated with other archives and the Museum of Modern Art to restore the 1921 film “The Seventh Day.” In 1990, NHF began work on “Going to the Movies: A Social History of Motion Pictures in Maine Communities.” The completed project—an exhibition including lectures and screenings—ran at The Maine Mall and Burlington Square Mall in 1996.

In 2003, NHF opened a  climate-controlled Conservation Center.

Membership services 

NHF began offering memberships to the public in 1989. Then, in 1991, NHF created a free video loan program for members. The loan program started with just 31 titles and now includes more than 400.

Cold storage 

In 2002, NHF broke ground on its $1.8 million state-of-the-art Conservation Center. “The Cube” was completed in 2003 and is located behind the Alamo Theatre. The structure offers  of closely monitored, climate-controlled conditions for film storage and preservation. The Cube has three temperature- and humidity-controlled floors. Two floors are kept at 45 degrees Fahrenheit and 25% Relative Humidity. The third floor is designed to prevent further deterioration of films suffering from advanced Vinegar Syndrome. It is kept at 25 degrees Fahrenheit and 30% relative humidity.

The structure's purpose follows the Library of Congress's National Film Preservation Plan  and represents the only preservation-level audiovisual storage in the region. In addition to climate-controlled conditions, The Cube is equipped with advanced air filtration and exchange technology, an environmentally friendly fire suppression system and flood protection. More than forty-five storage clients from across North America send motion picture film and videotape to Bucksport for safe-keeping.

Awards 

In 2003, NHF's founders Karan Sheldon and David Weiss received Maine Humanities Council’s Constance H. Carlson Award for exemplary service to the Humanities.

Two films from the NHF collections have been named to the National Film Registry by the Librarian of Congress, Dr. James Billington: 
named in 2005 The Making of an American (1920), and named in 2002 From Stump to Ship (1930).

The Society for Cinema and Media Studies named the anthology Amateur Movie Making: Aesthetics of the Everyday in New England Films, 1915-1960, as 2018 "Best Edited Collection."  The book, published by Indiana University Press, contains essays addressing works from the collections of Northeast Historic Film.

References

External links
 Northeast Historic Film
 Silver Light Award speech, November 7, 2013, by Andrea McCarty 

Film archives in the United States
Non-profit organizations based in Maine
Bucksport, Maine
Tourist attractions in Hancock County, Maine